Pizza My Heart may refer to:

Pizza My Heart (film), a 2005 television film
Pizza My Heart (restaurant), a chain of pizza restaurants in Northern California